Donald McIntyre (20 April 1851 – 6 November 1927)  was a Member of the Queensland Legislative Assembly.

Early life
McIntyre was born near Loch Lomond, Scotland in 1851.  The son of Peter McIntyre and his wife Jane (née McFarlane), he came to Australia with his family in  1862, sailing on the Ocean Chief  and landing at Moreton Bay.  He found work at several Stations over the years before establishing the Greenmount Cheese Factory in 1893.  He went on to open a further two cheese factories at Zahley (near present-day Goombungee) and Quinalow.

Politics
McIntyre won the seat of Aubigny for the Kidstonites in the 1907 state election.  He served  less than nine months before losing his seat at the 1908 state election.

Personal life
McIntyre married Mary Jane Keag on 10 July 1877 and together they had nine children. He  died in 1927 and was buried in the Drayton and Toowoomba Cemetery.

References

Members of the Queensland Legislative Assembly
1851 births
1927 deaths